This is a list of rural localities in Astrakhan Oblast, organized by district.

Astrakhan Oblast (Astrakhanskaya oblast) is a federal subject of Russia (an oblast) located in southern Russia. Its administrative center is the city of Astrakhan. As of the 2010 Census, its population was 1,010,073.

Akhtubinsky District 
Rural localities in Akhtubinsky District:

 Batayevka
 Bogdo
 Bolkhuny
 Butyrki
 Dmitriyevka
 Dubovy
 Duyunov
 Dzhelga
 Gromov
 Kamnev
 Kapustin Yar
 Klochkov
 Kochevaya
 Kononenko
 Korochin
 Lopin
 Martovsky
 Nikonov
 Novo-Nikolayevka
 Pirogovka
 Pokrovka
 Pologoye Zaymishche
 Razezd 15 km
 Rogozin
 Rozhdestvenka
 Sadovoye
 Shunguli
 Sokor
 Sokrutovka
 Solonchak
 Solyanka
 Sredny Baskunchak
 Stasov
 Tokarev
 Udachnoye
 Uspenka
 Verblyuzhy
 Zelyony Sad
 Zolotukha

Chernoyarsky District 
Rural localities in Chernoyarsky District:

 Baranovka
 Bundin
 Chyorny Yar
 Kalnovka
 Kamenny Yar
 Pody
 Razdolny
 Solodniki
 Solyonoye Zaymishche
 Stupino
 Ushakovka
 Zelyony Sad
 Zubovka

Ikryaninsky District 
Rural localities in Ikryaninsky District:

 Algaza
 Bakhtemir
 Beketovka
 Borkino
 Dzhamba
 Fyodorovka
 Gusinoye
 Ikryanoye
 Karabulak
 Khmelevoy
 Krasa
 Mayachnoye
 Mumra
 Ninovka
 Novo-Bulgary
 Oranzherei
 Ozernoye
 Petrovsky
 Posyolok Anatoliya Zvereva
 Sedlistoye
 Sergino
 Sergiyevka
 Staro-Volzhsky
 Svetloye
 Tovarny
 Troitsky
 Trudfront
 Vakhromeyevo
 Vostochnoye
 Yamnoye
 Zhitnoye
 Zyuzino

Kamyzyaksky District 
Rural localities in Kamyzyaksky District:

 Alexeyevka
 Arshin
 Azovsky
 Barany Bugor
 Biryuchek
 Chagan
 Chapayevo
 Damchik
 Forpost
 Gandurino
 Grushevo
 Ivanchug
 Kachkarinsky
 Karalat
 Karaulnoye
 Kaspy
 Khmelyovka
 Komarovka
 Lebyazhye
 Moryakov
 Nikolayevsky
 Nikolskoye
 Nizhnekalinovsky
 Nizhnenikolsky
 Novinsky
 Obrastsovo-Travino
 Obukhovsky
 Parygino
 Razdor
 Revin Khutor
 Samosdelka
 Semibugry
 Sizova Griva
 Stanya
 Trekhizbinka
 Tuzukley
 Uspekh
 Uvary
 Verkhnekalinovsky
 Yamana
 Zastenka
 Zaton
 Zhan-Aul

Kharabalinsky District 
Rural localities in Kharabalinsky District:

 Akhtubinka
 Ashuluk
 Bugor
 Dedushkin
 Gremuchy
 Khosheutovo
 Kochkovatka
 Mikhaylovka
 Rechnoye
 Sasykoli
 Sazany Ugol
 Selitrennoye
 Seroglazovo
 Tambovka
 Volnoye
 Zavolzhskoye
 Zelyonyye Prudy

Krasnoyarsky District 
Rural localities in Krasnoyarsky District:

 Alcha
 Allaysky
 Aysapay
 Bakharevsky
 Baklanye
 Baranovka
 Baybek
 Bely Ilmen
 Belyachy
 Buzan
 Buzan-pristan
 Buzan-razezd
 Cheryomukha
 Delta
 Dolginsky
 Dosang
 Dzhanay
 Karaozek
 Komsomolsky
 Kondakovka
 Koshelevka
 Krasny Yar
 Krivoy Buzan
 Kuyanly
 Maly Aral
 Mayachnoye
 Novourusovka
 Pereprava Korsaka
 Pervomaysky
 Podchalyk
 Priozerny
 Seitovka
 Solnechny
 Starourusovka
 Stepnoy
 Talnikovy
 Topal
 Vatazhnoye
 Verkhny Buzan
 Vishnyovy
 Vorobyevsky
 Vyatskoye
 Yasyn-Sokan
 Zabuzan
 Zaykovka

Limansky District 
Rural localities in Limansky District:

 Basinsk
 Basta
 Basy
 Biryuchya Kosa
 Budarino
 Dalneye
 Kamyshovo
 Karavannoye
 Kryazhevoye
 Lesnoye
 Mikhaylovka
 Novogeorgiyevsk
 Oleynikovo
 Olya
 Peschanoye
 Promyslovka
 Protochnoye
 Rynok
 Sudachye
 Voskresenovka
 Vyshka
 Yandyki
 Yar-Bazar
 Zaburunnoye
 Zarechnoye
 Zenzeli
 Zheleznodorozhnogo razezda №6
 Zorino

Narimanovsky District 
Rural localities in Narimanovsky District:

 Baranovka
 Barkhany
 Bishtyubinka
 Buruny
 Drofiny
 Dzhurak
 Karaagash
 Kovylny
 Krasnopeschany
 Kurchenko
 Lineynaya
 Lineynoye
 Mezhozyorny
 Mirny
 Nikolayevka
 Nitzan
 Nizhnelebyazhye
 Novokucherganovka
 Ostrov Dolgy
 Petropavlovka
 Prigorodny
 Prikaspiysky
 Rassvet
 Raznochinovka
 Rychansky
 Saygachny
 Sennoy
 Solyanka
 Solyony
 Starokucherganovka
 Tinaki
 Trusovo
 Tulata
 Tuluganovka
 Turkmenka
 Verkhnelebyazhye
 Volzhskoye
 Yango-Asker

Privolzhsky District 
Rural localities in Privolzhsky District:

 Assadulayevo
 Atal
 Biryukovka
 Boldinsky
 Bushma
 Chilimny
 Erle
 Funtovo-1
 Funtovo-2
 Ivanovsky
 Kaftanka
 Karagali
 Kilinchi
 Kinelle
 Kirpichnogo zavoda 1
 Kizan
 Kulakovka
 Kulpa
 Mansur
 Nachalovo
 Nartovsky
 Novonachalovsky
 Novy Kutum
 Osypnoy Bugor
 Pervoye Maya
 Polyana
 Poymenny
 Pridorozhny
 Rastopulovka
 Sadovy
 Steklozavoda
 Tatarskaya Bashmakovka
 Tri Protoka
 Vesyolaya Griva
 Vodyanovka
 Yaksatovo
 Yevpraksino

Volodarsky District 
Rural localities in Volodarsky District

 Aktyube
 Alexeyevka
 Altynzhar
 Baranovka
 Beregovoy
 Blinovo
 Boldyrevo
 Bolshoy Mogoy
 Churkin
 Chyorny Bugor
 Dianovka
 Forpost Starovatazhensky
 Goszapovednika
 Ilyinka
 Kalinino
 Kamardan
 Kazenny Bugor
 Konny Mogoy
 Korni
 Korovye
 Koshevanka
 Kostybe
 Kozlovo
 Krasny
 Krutoye
 Kudrino
 Kzyl-Tan
 Lebyazhye
 Makovo
 Maly Mogoy
 Marfino
 Meneshau
 Meshkovo
 Multanovo
 Narimanovo
 Nizhnyaya Sultanovka
 Novinka
 Novokrasnoye
 Novomayachnoye
 Novovasilyevo
 Novy Rychan
 Paromny
 Plotovinka
 Razdor
 Razino
 Sakhma
 Samoylovsky
 Sarmantayevka
 Shagano-Kondakovka
 Sizy Bugor
 Sorochye
 Srednyaya Sultanovka
 Stary Altynzhar
 Stolbovoy
 Talovinka
 Tishkovo
 Trubny
 Tsvetnoye
 Tuluganovka
 Tumak
 Tyurino
 Vatazhka
 Verkhniye Kolki
 Vinny
 Volodarsky
 Yablonka
 Yamnoye
 Yegin-Aul
 Zelenga
 Zelyony Ostrov

Yenotayevsky District 
Rural localities in Yenotayevsky District:

 Beregovoy
 Bloshnoy
 Fyodorovka
 Grachi
 Iki-Chibirsky
 Ivanovka
 Kopanovka
 Kosika
 Kozinka
 Lenino
 Mikhaylovka
 Nikolayevka
 Nikolskoye
 Novostroy
 Posyolok Gospitomnika
 Pribrezhny
 Prishib
 Promyslovy
 Seroglazka
 Tabun-Aral
 Vetlyanka
 Vladimirovka
 Volzhsky
 Vostok
 Yekaterinovka
 Yenotayevka
 Zamyany

See also
 
 Lists of rural localities in Russia

References

Astrakhan Oblast